Strausberg is a town in Brandenburg, Germany, located 30 km east of Berlin. With a population of about 27,000 it is the largest town in the district of Märkisch-Oderland.

History
Strausberg was founded circa 1240, and in 1333 its first town hall was built. Today, a historic defensive wall borders the old town. In the 19th century, industrialization took place and the town developed a local labour movement, including union structures and a local branch of both the Social Democratic and the Communist Party of Germany. 

In World War II Strausberg housed a switching centre for teleprinter links encrypted by the Lorenz cipher from Hitler and the High Command to various Army Group commanders;see Fish (cryptography) 

After 1945, the town became part of East Germany and the seat of its Ministry of National Defence. Strausberg was the administrative seat of the Strausberg district, until a 1993 merger with Bad Freienwalde and Seelow formed "Märkisch-Oderland", with Seelow becoming the new administrative seat of the district. It is where the German Army Command is located.

Geography

Strausberg covers an area of 68 km2. There are over 1,500 businesses and 100 km of footpath. It is known as "Die grüne Stadt am See" (the green town by the lake). Its biggest lake is Straussee, located between the town and the biggest forest, the Strausberger Forest. The forest and water protection nurtures a unique environment.

Location
Strausberg is 30 km east of Berlin (from the district of Marzahn-Hellersdorf) and 30 km to the west of Kostrzyn, at the Polish border. It is part of Berlin/Brandenburg Metropolitan Region and a middle centre (Mittelzentrum) of it. Its bordering municipalities are, listed in a clockwise sense starting from north, Altlandsberg, Oberbarnim, Buckow, Garzau-Garzin, Rehfelde, Rüdersdorf and Petershagen-Eggersdorf.

Subdivision
The town is divided into nine boroughs: Fasanenpark, Gartenstadt, Hegermühle, Neue Mühle, Postbruch, Schillerhöhe (with the Spitzmühle), Strausberg Nord, Strausberg Stadt and Vorstadt.
The municipality has three hamlets (Ortsteile):
Gladowshöhe (217 inhabitants)
Hohenstein (233 inhabitants)
Ruhlsdorf (44 inhabitants)

Demography
After an increase of population since  World War II, Strausberg has slowed its "growth", remaining at almost 26,000 inhabitants in the last census, with a slight decrease in the early years of the 21st century. Forecasts, however, anticipate a considerable decline within the next two decades. For further details, see sources of the following graphics.

Transport

There are three other stops on the S5 line within the town, these being Strausberg Hegermühle, Strausberg Stadt and Strausberg Nord.

Strausberg is also served by the Strausberg Railway (Strausberger Eisenbahn), a light rail line with nine stops, which connects the main railway station to the centre of town. Besides the main railway station, the other 8 stops are: Landhausstraße, Schlagmühle, Stadtwald, Hegermühle, Wolfstal, Käthe-Kollwitz-Straße, Elisabethstraße and Lustgarten, the northern terminus. The Strausberg Railway also operates the Straussee Ferry (Strausseefähre), an unusual electrically operated passenger cable ferry across Straussee.

The town has also a small aerodrome ("Flugplatz Strausberg", ICAO: EDAY), opened in 1927, with a runway of 1,200 m × 28 m, and situated 2 kilometres in the east of town centre.

Sport
The local football representative is the FC Strausberg, competing in the fifth tier of German football. Home games of FCS are played at the "Energiearena" stadium.

Twin towns – sister cities

Strausberg is twinned with:
 Dębno, Poland
 Frankenthal, Germany
 Hamont-Achel, Belgium
 Terezín, Czech Republic

Notable people
Andreas Angelus (1561–1598), clergyman, teacher and chronicler
Paul Max Bertschy (1840–1911), architect
Johannes Haw (1871–1949), Roman Catholic priest
Sigmund Jähn (1937–2019), cosmonaut and pilot
Siegfried Kasche (1903–1947), Nazi Storm Trooper officer and ambassador executed for war crimes
Kurt Wagner (1904–1989), general
Michael Gartenschläger (1944–1976), political prisoner
Martin Schindler (born 1996), professional darts player

Gallery

References

Bibliography
Rolf Barthel, Michael Haddenhorst: Städte in Deutschland - Strausberg. Nicolaische Verlagsbuchhandlung, Beuermann GmbH, Berlin 1993 
 Horst Klein: Zur Geschichte der Ortsgruppe der KPD Strausberg 1920 bis 1946 (Thesen), in: Jahrbuch für Forschungen zur Geschichte der Arbeiterbewegung, No. I/2002. 
 Horst Klein: 110 Jahre organisierte Arbeiterbewegung - 1887–1997 Sozialdemokraten in Strausberg (Thesen), in: Jahrbuch für Forschungen zur Geschichte der Arbeiterbewegung, No. II/2003.

External links

 Strausberg.de
 Stadt-Strausberg.de
 Strausberg-Live
 FC Strausberg
 Strausberger Eisenbahn (urban railway)
 Stadtwiki Strausberg
 Map of railways in Strausberg on www.urbanrail.net

 
Localities in Märkisch-Oderland